St. Mary's Catholic High School, Fujairah is a Catholic school located in the Sakamkam area in Fujairah, United Arab Emirates.

History
The school was founded in 2002. The school was initially managed by Italian Nuns, which was then handed over to Salesians of Don Bosco priests from the Chennai Province of India.

Curriculum
The school follows and is affiliated to the CBSE curriculum, iGCSE Edexcel Board and GCE A'Levels.

References

External links
 School website

2002 establishments in the United Arab Emirates
Educational institutions established in 2002
Catholic schools in the United Arab Emirates
Schools in the Emirate of Fujairah
Fujairah City
Salesian schools